Thomas or Tom Charlton may refer to:

Thomas de Charlton, Archdeacon of Totnes in 1302
Thomas Charlton (bishop) (died 1344), Bishop of Hereford, Lord High Treasurer of England, Lord Privy Seal, and Lord Chancellor of Ireland
Thomas Charlton (MP) for Middlesex  (died 1410)
Thomas Charlton (speaker) (1417–1465), Speaker of the House of Commons of England in 1454
Thomas U. P. Charlton (1779–1835), American writer and politician
Thomas Charlton (cricketer) (1815–1886), English cricketer
Tommy Charlton, English footballer (born circa 1887)
Thomas Malcolm Charlton (1923–1997), British civil engineer and historian
Thomas Charlton (rower) (born 1934), American Olympic rower

See also
 Thomas Carlton (disambiguation)